Voyage d'Egypte et de Nubie (1755) records Frederic Louis Norden's extensive documentation and drawings of his voyage through Egypt in 1737–38. It contains some of the very first realistic drawings of Egyptian monuments and to this day remains a primary source for the looks of Egyptian monuments before widespread 19th and 20th-century tourism and excavations.

The Royal Danish Academy of Sciences and Letters, under the order of Frederick V of Denmark, first published the book in 1755. Norden had already done some preliminary work, but got entangled in war-service for England and died in France 1742 of tuberculosis before anything was ready. He left his documents and drawings to his friend.

Mark Tuscher from Nuremberg made the drawings into copperplates for the publication.

Norden published some test drawings from his voyage in 1741, under the long name Drawings of Some Ruins and Colossal Statues at Thebes in Egypt, with an account of the same in a letter to the Royal Society.

A very often-used extract from this book is Norden's drawing of the Great Sphinx of Giza. As the first near-realistic drawing of the sphinx, he is the earliest known to draw the Sphinx with the nose missing. Although Richard Pococke in the same year visits and later publishes a stylish rendering (in A Description of the East and Some other Countries, 1743), he draws it with the nose still on. Pococke's drawing is a faithful adoption of Cornelis de Bruijn's drawing of 1698 (Voyage to the Levant, 1702, English trans.), featuring only minor changes.

It is highly unlikely if the nose was still on that Norden out of free fantasy would leave it out. This drawing is often used to disprove the story that Napoleon I of France destroyed the nose of the Sphinx.

Publications of the book (or parts of it)
 1741 – Drawings of some ruins and colossal statues...., The Royal Society, London.
 1755 – Voyage d'Egypte et de Nubie, tome premier, The Royal Danish Academy of Sciences and Letters, Copenhagen.
 1757 – Travels in Egypt & Nubia, 2 Volumes in 1, Lockyer Davis & Charles Reymer, London. (translated by Peter Templeman)
 1757 – A compendium of the travels of F.L. Norden through Egypt and Nubia, J. Smith, Dublin.
 1775 - Beskrivelse over Ægypten og Nubien, Copenhagen, translated by Jørgen Stauning. The first Danish translation of parts of the work.
 1779 – F.L. Norden, Beschreibung seiner Reise durch Egypten und Nubien, Johann Ernst Meyer, Leipzig and Breslau.
 1780 – The antiquities, natural history, ruins and other curiosities of Egypt, Nubia and Thebes. Exemplified in near two hundred drawings taken on the spot, Lockyer Davis, London.
 1790 – Frederik Ludvig Nordens Reiser igiennem Ægypten og Nubien in Samling af de bedste og nyeste Reisebeskrivelser i et udførligt Udtog, vol. 2, Gyldendal, Copenhagen.
 1792 – The antiquities, natural history, ruins, and other curiosities of Egypt, Nubia, and Thebes. Exemplified in near two hundred drawings, taken on the spot, Edward Jeffery, London.
 1795–98 – Voyage d'Egypte et de Nubie, Nouvelle édition, Pierre Didot l'ainé, Paris. (notes and additions by L. Langlès) v.1, v.2
 1800 – Atlas du voyage d'Egypte et de Nubie, Bibliothèque portative des voyages, tome XI, Lepetit, Paris.
 1814 – The travels of Frederick Lewis Norden through Egypt and Nubia, Sydney's Press, New Haven.

See also
Egypt in the European imagination

External links
 Danish Royal Library – Voyage d'Egypte et de Nubie
 Danish Royal Library – Travels in Egypt & Nubia
 Bibliothèque nationale de France (Gallica) – Voyage d'Egypte et de Nubie, tome premier, The Danish Royal Library, Copenhagen
 Bibliothèque nationale de France (Gallica) – Travels in Egypt & Nubia, 2 Volumes in 1, Lockyer Davis & Charles Reymer, London
 NYPL Digital Gallery – The antiquities, natural history, ruins and other curiosities of Egypt, Nubia and Thebes, Lockyer Davis, London
 Oslo University – Voyage d'Egypte et de Nubie

1755 books
Danish non-fiction books
Travel books
Egyptology books